Alfred Charles Hobday (19 April 1870 in Faversham – 23 February 1942 in Tankerton) was an English viola player who made his career in England. He was the elder brother of the double-bass player Claude Hobday.

Hobday studied violin and viola at the Royal College of Music in London with Henry Holmes, and he was one of the college's earliest graduates on viola. He played in several leading string quartet musical ensembles, notably at St James's Hall, with Joseph Joachim, Lady Hallé, Ries and the cellist Alfredo Piatti. He also gave many viola recitals with his wife, the pianist Ethel Sharpe, later known as Ethel Hobday.

Much of Hobday's career was spent as an orchestral musician. In 1895 he became principal viola in Queen Victoria's private band and was awarded the Diamond Jubilee medal and Coronation medal for services as part of that group.  Hobday was solo viola at the Royal Covent Garden Opera from 1900 to 1914. He was also the leading viola of the Royal Philharmonic Orchestra, of the Goossens Orchestra, of the London Symphony Orchestra from its inception in 1904 until 1930, and of the orchestras of the chief festivals. He soloed with orchestras on a few occasions, most notably in several performances of Hector Berlioz's Harold in Italy.

Hobday premiered several works including Frank Bridge's Phantasy for Piano Quartet, Vaughan Williams' Four Hymns for Tenor, and String Orchestra and Vaughan Williams's Quintet in C Minor for Pianoforte, Violin, Viola, Violoncello, and Double Bass. The English composer Ernest Walker also composed works specifically for Hobday.

Recordings
Like many other prominent violists of the early twentieth century, Hobday's legacy is poorly reflected on recordings. All of his commercial recordings are limited to his playing second viola with established ensembles.

String Sextet No. 1 (Brahms), op. 18 with Quatuor Pro Arte (Hobday, vla 2 and Anthony Pini, cello 2) 1935
String Sextet No. 2 (Brahms), op. 36 with Budapest String Quartet (Hobday, vla 2 and Anthony Pini, cello 2) 1937  
String Quintet No. 1 (Brahms), op. 88 with Budapest String Quartet (Hobday, vla 2) 1937
String Quintet No. 3 (Mozart), K. 515 with Quatuor Pro Arte (Hobday, vla 2) 1934 
String Quintet No. 3 (Mozart), K. 515 (Andante only), with Quatuor Pro Arte (Hobday, vla 2) 1931 
String Quintet No. 4 (Mozart), K. 516 with London String Quartet (Hobday, vla 2) 1917 
String Quintet No. 4 (Mozart), K. 516 with Quatuor Pro Arte (Hobday, vla 2) 1934 
String Quintet No. 5 (Mozart), K. 593 with Quatuor Pro Arte (Hobday, vla 2) 1936

References

A. Eaglefield-Hull, A Dictionary of Modern Music and Musicians (Dent, London 1924).
Bynog, David M. "Alfred Hobday 1870-1942." English Viola Society Newsletter (October 2008): 15-18.

1870 births
1942 deaths
English classical musicians
Alumni of the Royal Academy of Music
English classical violists